Derek Bishton (born 1948) is an English journalist and photographer. After periods working as a journalist on the Newcastle Evening Chronicle and the Birmingham Post, and as a publicist for the Birmingham Arts Lab, he founded the photographic magazine Ten.8 in 1979, which was published in Handsworth until 1992. Between 1996 and 2002 he was the editor of the Electronic Telegraph, Europe's first daily online newspaper.

References

Photographers from Birmingham, West Midlands
1948 births
English male journalists
Living people